The 1975 FIM Motocross World Championship was the 19th F.I.M. Motocross Racing World Championship season.

Summary
In a rematch of the previous season, Suzuki's Roger De Coster and Husqvarna's Heikki Mikkola were once again the two top competitors in the chase for the 500cc motocross world championship. De Coster claimed 12 moto victories to reclaim the title and win his fourth world championship. Mikkola came in second place with 5 moto victories while De Coster's Suzuki teammate, Gerrit Wolsink finished the season in third place. 

Harry Everts won the 250cc title for his first world championship. His victory also marked the only motocross world championship for the Austrian Puch factory. Puch fielded a motorcycle which featured an innovative twin carburetor system. Gaston Rahier dominated the inaugural 125cc world championship, winning 7 out of the first 8 Grands Prix for the Suzuki factory racing team. Honda scored its first-ever overall victory in a motocross world championship Grand Prix when Marty Smith won the 125cc United States Grand Prix. Akira Watanabe became the first Japanese rider to win an overall victory in an FIM Motocross Grand Prix race when he won the 125cc Spanish Grand Prix on August 17.

Grands Prix

500cc

250cc

125cc

Final standings

References

External links
 

FIM Motocross World Championship season
Motocross World Championship seasons